Julie McNiven (born October 11, 1980) is an American actress and singer.  McNiven was born in Amherst, Massachusetts, and got her start in local community theatre productions. She is best known for her recurring roles in Mad Men (2007–2009) and Supernatural (2008–2010). McNiven also had a recurring role in the second season of Stargate: Universe (2010–2011).

McNiven studied swinging trapeze as a teenager at French Woods Festival of the Performing Arts. She also attended the summer program at Circle in the Square. She is a graduate of Salem State University (Salem, Massachusetts).

In 2010, McNiven married Michael Blackman Beck, with whom she has two sons, Tasman Scott Beck born December 2014 and Jetson born August 2021.

Filmography

Film

Television

References

External links 

 
 

Living people
People from Amherst, Massachusetts
Actresses from Massachusetts
American film actresses
American television actresses
Salem State University alumni
20th-century American actresses
21st-century American actresses
1980 births
Singers from Massachusetts
21st-century American singers